Bernece Berkman (1911–1988), known as Bernece Berkman-Hunter after marriage, was an American painter born in Chicago, Illinois. She was inspired by what she saw in urban Chicago during the Great Depression and is best known for paintings depicting the plight of industrial workers and the poor.

Life and career 
Berkman-Hunter, née Berkman, was born in 1911 in Chicago. She took evening sketching classes in Todros Geller's studio and studied oil painting with Geller. Rudolph Weisenborn was another early influence. Working with both of these artists, Berkman was introduced to Cubism and Expressionism and her work became more political in nature. She also studied briefly in New York at Hunter College and at The New School for Social Research under Stuart Davis.

In 1934, Berkman-Hunter's work was exhibited for the first time in a group show of Jewish artists at the Palmer House in Chicago. In 1939 she exhibited a painting at the New York World's Fair. Berkman-Hunter's work was included in the 1940 MoMA show American Color Prints Under $10. The show was organized as a vehicle for bringing affordable fine art prints to the general public.

She married Oscar H. Hunter, an African-American writer, in 1946. Together they founded a wallpaper company, Berk-Hunter Associates, in 1949. They divorced in 1976.

In 1947, she was included in the Dallas Museum of Fine Arts exhibition of the National Serigraph Society artists.

In 1972, she traveled to France and Italy. Her travel diary is housed at the Library of Congress.

She was an active member of the artistic community in Chicago and New York, and belonged to the Chicago Society of Artists and the Chicago Women's Salon.

Berkman-Hunter died in 1988 in New York.

Exhibitions
American Artists Congress, 1937
Denver Art Museum, 1938
Springfield (MA) Museum of Fine Art
WPA Exhibition, Art Institute of Chicago, 1938
New York World's Fair, 1939
International Water Color Exhibition, Art Institute of Chicago, 1940
Chicago and Vicinity Exhibit, Art Institute of Chicago, 1940–41
After the Great Crash: New Deal Art in Illinois, Illinois State Museum, Springfield (IL), 1983

Selected works
Jews in Flight (1939)
Untitled, Man in the City (1943)

Collections

The Art Institute of Chicago
Carnegie Museum of Art
Evansville State Hospital
Bernard Friedman Collection
Seattle Art Museum
Smithsonian American Art Museum
University of Iowa
University of Michigan
University of Nebraska, Omaha

References

External links
Bernece Berkman-Hunter papers, 1910-1991, Library of Congress

1911 births
1988 deaths
Painters from New York (state)
School of the Art Institute of Chicago alumni
Artists from Chicago
Painters from Illinois
Hunter College alumni
The New School alumni
American women painters
20th-century American painters
20th-century American women artists